Gennady Nikolayev (8 July 1936 – 6 June 2013) was a Russian swimmer who competed in the 1956 Summer Olympics and in the 1960 Summer Olympics.

References

1936 births
2013 deaths
Russian male freestyle swimmers
Olympic swimmers of the Soviet Union
Swimmers at the 1956 Summer Olympics
Swimmers at the 1960 Summer Olympics
Olympic bronze medalists for the Soviet Union
Olympic bronze medalists in swimming
European Aquatics Championships medalists in swimming
Medalists at the 1956 Summer Olympics
Soviet male freestyle swimmers